"Natural Born Wesen" is the 14th episode and of the supernatural drama television series Grimm of season 2 and the 36th overall, which premiered on March 15, 2013, on NBC. The episode was written by Thomas Ian Griffith and Mary Page Keller, and was directed by Michael Watkins.

Plot
Opening quote: "So the animals debated how they might drive the robbers out, and at last settled on an idea."

Nick (David Giuntoli) is now experiencing side effects after drinking the antidote. Monroe (Silas Weir Mitchell) takes some of Nick's blood and pours it on a sample that is ingested by Juliette (Bitsie Tulloch) and Renard (Sasha Roiz). When she returns home, she has hallucinations of her house with endless staircase and an enormous pit in the living room.

The next day, Monroe goes to a bank when suddenly, three Wesen rob the bank. Investigating the robbery, Nick and Hank (Russell Hornsby) are told by Monroe that the Wesen broke an important law of honor of the Wesen: the Gesetzbuch Ehrenkodex, which forbids any Wesen from exposing their form to the public to "take advantage of normal folk". As Nick is a Grimm, he must deal with this.

Monroe decides to find out in a Wesen bar about the robbers. The robbers begins to attack him until he is saved by Nick and Hank and Monroe manages to deduce they were the robbers. The next day, the robbers pull a heist on another bank but they kill a woman and a police officer during their escape. This continues to cause some concerns in the Wesen community, who show up in the spice shop. While asking a homeless man in a factory, they discover one of the robbers is Gus Campbell (Eric Martin Reid).

Renard discovers the two other robbers and sends an email to De Groot (Nurmi Husa), a member of the Wesen Council to handle the situation before the Wesen get known to the public. Gus tells the robbers Cole (Callard Harris) and Krysta (Lili Mirojnick) that he plans to leave them and is killed. They flee to the factory while Nick and Hank find Gus' body. Nick and Hank arrive to the factory and arrest Cole and Krysta, but they are certain that they won't be arrested because they have not any evidence.

While Renard gives a press conference in the station, Nick and Hank bring Cole and Krysta. Suddenly, an assassin appears and shoots Cole and Krysta, killing them both. It turns out De Groot sent the assassin in response to the violation of the Wesen law. The episode ends as Juliette continues having hallucinations in her bed while receiving a call. As lightning invades the room, she hears a deep voice saying, "I just want you to know the truth."

Production notes
The writers of the episode, Thomas Ian Griffith and Mary Page Keller are husband and wife.
Mary Page Keller portrayed Dr. Higgins in the eighth episode of Grimm season 2, "The Other Side"

Reception

Viewers
The episode was viewed by 4.91 million people, earning a 1.4/5 in the 18-49 rating demographics on the Nielson ratings scale, ranking second on its timeslot and fifth for the night in the 18-49 demographics, behind 20/20, Blue Bloods, Last Man Standing, and a rerunShark Tank. This was an slight increase in viewership from the previous episode, which was watched by 4.90 million viewers with a 1.5/5. This means that 1.4 percent of all households with televisions watched the episode, while 5 percent of all households watching television at that time watched it. With DVR factoring in, the episode was watched by 7.44 million viewers with a 2.5 ratings share in the 18-49 demographics.

Critical reviews
"Natural Born Wesen" received positive reviews. The A.V. Club's Kevin McFarland gave the episode a "B" grade and wrote, "The best thing about 'Natural Born Wesen' is that it echoes last season's 'Cat And Mouse' which similarly expanded the Wesen world in compelling fashion. But this episode isn't as good as that one, since it skimps on the explanations and necessary confrontations that arise from the information that Monroe and Rosalee reveal."

Nick McHatton from TV Fanatic, gave a 4.0 star rating out of 5, stating: "One of Grimms greatest storytelling abilities is having the advantage of literally showing what is directly underneath the surface of its characters, using it to quickly give the audience a characterization; this technique has been used with Rosalee, but she's continually breaking out of her meek shell now. This might be due to Nick, like Monroe, but some of it is due to her taking up her family's business and finding her place in the Wesen world."

Shilo Adams from TV Overmind, wrote: "At the spice shop, Juliette and Renard aren't sure what's going on regarding Nick, the cat that started this whole mess, and their attraction to one another. Monroe attempts to explain the 'emotional nuclear meltdown' that they just went through, but it doesn't seem to get through the either of them, partially because they were more focused on Nick waking up from the drink that he consumed at the end of last week's episode."

Josie Campbell from TV.com wrote, "While the first two episodes after Grimms long break were both enjoyable, the show needs to finally address the nuts and bolts of the world it's presented to us. We need to see what the Wesen get out of living with humans, or explain why living on their own in hidden all-Wesen communities doesn't work. We need to meet more Wesen who don't , and we need to see that humans in Portland break the law, too—otherwise we're dealing with a world where only Wesen are criminals, and if that's the case we're back to the question of why they're even attempting to fit in."

References

External links
 

Grimm (season 2) episodes
2013 American television episodes